Stamoulo is a Greek dance from Aridaia, a former municipality of Pella, Greece. 
It is a wedding dance that is performed by the couples and their relatives.

See also
Music of Greece
Greek dances

References
Ελληνικοί παραδοσιακοί χοροί: Η Σταμούλω ή Στάνκαινα

Greek dances